Casey Dellacqua and Yaroslava Shvedova were the defending champions, but Dellacqua chose not to participate this year as she welcomed her second child. Shvedova played alongside Tímea Babos, but lost in the quarterfinals to Caroline Garcia and Kristina Mladenovic.
Garcia and Mladenovic went on to win the title, defeating Martina Hingis and Sania Mirza in the final, 6–4, 6–4.

Seeds
The top four seeds received a bye into the second round.

Draw

Finals

Top half

Bottom half

References
Main Draw

Women's Doubles